BBC Radio 1 Live in Concert is a live album by British rock band Atomic Rooster. It consists of a specially-recorded, short concert staged at the BBC's Paris Theatre on 27 July 1972.

It was initially released in 1993 on the Windsong Records label, but all six tracks were also included on Castle Communications' 2004 reissues of In Hearing of Atomic Rooster and Made in England. Three tracks from the concert are also to be found on Hux Records' Devil's Answer compilation.

Track listing 

 "Breakthrough" (Crane, Pat Darnell) 7:21
 "Stand by Me" (Crane) 5:00
 "People You Can't Trust" (Crane) 4:38
 "A Spoonful of Bromide Helps the Pulse Rate Go Down" (Crane) 4:50
 "All in Satan's Name" (Parnell) 4:04
 "Devil’s Answer" (Du Cann) 7:10

Personnel 
Atomic Rooster
 Vincent Crane - Hammond organ, piano
 Chris Farlowe - vocals
 Steve Bolton - guitars
 Ric Parnell - drums, percussion

Atomic Rooster live albums
1993 live albums
BBC Radio recordings